John Cena is an American professional wrestler, actor, and former rapper. The following are his roles in films, television series and video games. The filmography does not include his professional wrestling appearances in any form of media or featured televised productions.

Film

Television

Video games 
Cena appears in many WWE video games as himself, as well as motion capture.

References 

American filmographies
Male actor filmographies